Syntomodrillia woodringi is a species of sea snail, a marine gastropod mollusk in the family Drilliidae.

Description
The length of the shell varies between 7 mm and 18 mm.

Distribution
This marine species occurs in the Gulf of Mexico, the Caribbean Sea, of the Antilles and NorthernBrasil.

References

 P. Bartsch (1934), New Mollusks of the Family Turritidae:(with Eight Plates); Smithsonian Institution

External links
 Rosenberg G., Moretzsohn F. & García E. F. (2009). Gastropoda (Mollusca) of the Gulf of Mexico, Pp. 579–699 in Felder, D.L. and D.K. Camp (eds.), Gulf of Mexico–Origins, Waters, and Biota. Biodiversity. Texas A&M Press, College Station, Texas
  Tucker, J.K. 2004 Catalog of recent and fossil turrids (Mollusca: Gastropoda). Zootaxa 682:1–1295.
 Fallon P.J. (2016). Taxonomic review of tropical western Atlantic shallow water Drilliidae (Mollusca: Gastropoda: Conoidea) including descriptions of 100 new species. Zootaxa. 4090(1): 1–363

woodringi
Gastropods described in 1934